Doxtader is a surname. Notable people with the surname include:
Erik Doxtader, American rhetorician
Harry Doxtader (born 1827), American politician
John Doxtader (1760–1801), Loyalist during the American Revolution
Han Yerry (1724–1794), also known as Honyery Doxtator, Oneida war chief during the American Revolution